Omiodes accepta, the sugarcane leafroller, is a moth of the family Crambidae. It is endemic to the Hawaiian islands of Kauai, Oahu, Molokai, Maui and Hawaii.

The larvae feed on various grasses, including Digitaria prurient, Oplismenus compositus, Pampas grass, Panicum nephehphilum, Paspalum conjugatum, Paspalum orbiculare, sugarcane and the sedge Baumea meyenii.

The larvae roll and spin the leaves of various forest grasses together to form a tube in which they live. It is most abundant in the cooler uplands. When sugarcane was brought to Hawaii, it added the plant to its list of food grasses and frequently becomes a pest to sugarcane.

A recently hatched larva feeds in the folded together tip of a grass leaf which it has fastened
with silk. It eats the surface of the leaf in spots, leaving the under epidermis, which gives the
appearance of dead spots on the leaf. As it becomes larger it folds the leaf together lower down, doing this from time to time as it needs to enlarge its retreat, or have access to a fresh portion of leaf for feeding. In about two weeks the larva has grown to a length of 15 mm and now eats the whole substance of the leaf, not leaving the epidermis as before. Having used up one leaf, the larva migrates to another. Caterpillars are fully grown in about three weeks from hatching.

Pupation takes place within a slight cocoon of white silk in the retreat where the larva has lived. Although the cocoon is sometimes made beneath the leaf-sheaths of cane and in other favorable places. The pupal period lasts 8–13 days.

References

accepta
Endemic moths of Hawaii
Moths described in 1877